Lache J. Seastrunk (pronounced ; born July 29, 1991) is a former American football running back. He played college football at Baylor. Seastrunk was drafted by the Washington Redskins in the sixth round of the 2014 NFL Draft.

Early years
A native of Temple, Texas, Seastrunk attended Temple High School, where he finished his high school career with 4,127 yards and 52 touchdowns. He was a 2009 USA Today All-USA selection. Regarded as a five-star prospect by Rivals.com, he was listed as the No. 3 running back in the class of 2010. He played in the 2010 U.S. Army All-American Bowl. He chose Oregon over Auburn among others.

The process of his recruitment was part of a 27-month NCAA investigation into alleged recruiting rules violations by Oregon in using a middleman, Willie Lyles, to secure both Seastrunk and LaMichael James for the Ducks; the results were three years' probation and taking away of three scholarships.

Seastrunk was also a standout track athlete, he has personal bests of 10.50 seconds in the 100 meters and 6.60 meters in long jump during his preparatory track career. He clocked at 10.64 in the 100 meters as a sophomore and won the district meet that same year with a time of 10.77 seconds. He broke three Temple High School records (100 meters, 400 meters and long jump) as a 13-year-old eighth-grader.

College career
Seastrunk attended the University of Oregon for his freshman year.  On August 20, 2011 it was reported that Seastrunk was granted a release from Oregon with plans to transfer to Baylor University.

Before the end of the 2012 season, Seastrunk predicted he would win the Heisman Trophy next year and said "I know I am the best back in the country." Seastrunk finished the season with 1,012 yards on 131 carries but averaged 138.2 yards per game and scored five touchdowns during Baylor's 4-1 run to end the season. He did not win the Heisman Trophy.

Seastrunk announced on January 6, 2014 that he would forgo his senior season and enter the 2014 NFL Draft.

Career statistics

Professional career

Washington Redskins
Seastrunk was selected by the Washington Redskins with the 186th overall pick in the 2014 NFL Draft. He signed a four-year, $2.33 million contract with the Redskins on May 16, 2014. The Redskins waived him on August 30, 2014 for final roster cuts before the start of the 2014 season, losing the third-string running back position to fellow rookie Silas Redd. He was not signed to the practice squad.

Carolina Panthers
Seastrunk was signed to the practice squad of the Carolina Panthers on September 16, 2014. He was waived from the team on September 25, 2014.

Tennessee Titans
Seastrunk was signed to the practice squad of the Tennessee Titans on October 1, 2014.

He signed a futures contract with the Titans on December 29, 2014. He was waived from the team on May 18, 2015.

Dallas Cowboys
Seastrunk signed with the Dallas Cowboys in June 2015. He was waived on August 20, 2015.

Calgary Stampeders
On May 19, 2016, Seastrunk signed with the Calgary Stampeders. On June 19, 2016, Seastrunk was released.

Saskatchewan Roughriders
On June 26, 2016, Seastrunk was signed to the Saskatchewan Roughriders' practice roster.

New York Jets
Seastrunk was signed by the New York Jets on August 13, 2016. On August 28, 2016, Seastrunk was waived by the Jets.

CenTex Cavalry
Seastrunk signed with the CenTex Cavalry of Champions Indoor Football (CIF) on April 10, 2017.

Winnipeg Blue Bombers
On May 11, 2017, Seastrunk signed with the Winnipeg Blue Bombers of the Canadian Football League. He was released before the start of the regular season on May 28, 2017.

References

External links
Baylor Bears bio
IAAF profile

1991 births
Living people
People from Temple, Texas
Players of American football from Texas
American football running backs
Canadian football running backs
African-American players of American football
African-American players of Canadian football
Baylor Bears football players
Oregon Ducks football players
Washington Redskins players
Carolina Panthers players
Tennessee Titans players
Dallas Cowboys players
Calgary Stampeders players
Saskatchewan Roughriders players
New York Jets players
CenTex Cavalry players
21st-century African-American sportspeople